Annie Chapman (born Eliza Ann Smith; 25 September 1840 – 8 September 1888) was the second canonical victim of the notorious unidentified serial killer Jack the Ripper, who killed and mutilated a minimum of five women in the Whitechapel and Spitalfields districts of London from late August to early November 1888.

Although previous murders linked to Jack the Ripper (then known as the "Whitechapel murderer") had received considerable press and public attention, the murder of Annie Chapman generated a state of panic in the East End of London, with police under increasing pressure to apprehend the culprit.

Early life
Annie Chapman was born Eliza Ann Smith in Paddington on 25 September 1840. She was the first of five children born to George Smith, and Ruth Chapman. George Smith was a soldier, having enlisted in the 2nd Regiment of Life Guards in December 1834. Reportedly, the location of Chapman's earliest years revolved around her father's military service served between London and Windsor.

Chapman's parents were not married at the time of her birth, although they married on 22 February 1842, in Paddington. Following the birth of their second child in 1844, the family relocated to Knightsbridge, where George Smith became a valet. The family eventually relocated to Berkshire in 1856.

According to her brother, Fountain, Annie had "first took a drink when she was quite young", quickly developing a weakness for alcohol, and although both he and two of his other sisters had persuaded her to sign a pledge to refrain from consuming alcohol, she "was tempted and fell" despite the "over and over" efforts of her siblings to dissuade her.

Family relocation
Census records from 1861 indicate all members of the Smith family—except Annie—had relocated to the parish of Clewer. Chapman is believed to have remained in London, possibly due to her employment commitments as a domestic servant. Her father, George Smith (also known as William Smith), was the valet to Captain Thomas Naylor Leland of the Denbighshire Yeomanry Cavalry. On 13 June 1863, Smith accompanied his employer to a horse racing event. He lodged with his employer that evening at the Elephant and Castle, Wrexham. That night, George Smith committed suicide by cutting his throat.

Contemporary accounts describe Annie Chapman as an intelligent and sociable woman with a weakness for alcohol—particularly rum. An acquaintance described Chapman at the inquest into her murder as being "very civil and industrious when sober", before noting: "I have often seen her the worse for drink." She was 5 feet in height and had blue eyes and wavy, dark brown hair, leading acquaintances to give her the nickname "Dark Annie".

Marriage

On 1 May 1869, Annie married John James Chapman, who was related to her mother. The ceremony was conducted at All Saints Church in the Knightsbridge district of London, and was witnessed by one of her sisters, Emily Laticia, and a colleague of her husband named George White. The Chapmans' residence on their marriage certificate is listed as 29 Montpelier Place, Brompton, although the couple are believed to have briefly resided with White and his wife in Bayswater.

In the years following their marriage, the Chapmans lived at various West London addresses. In the early 1870s, John Chapman obtained employment in the service of a nobleman in Bond Street.

Children
The couple had three children: Emily Ruth (b. 25 June 1870); Annie Georgina (b. 5 June 1873); and John Alfred (b. 21 November 1880). Emily Ruth was born at Chapman's mother's home in Montpelier Place, Knightsbridge; Annie Georgina was born at South Bruton Mews, Mayfair; and John Alfred was born in the Berkshire village of Bray. John was born crippled. The Chapmans sought medical help for their son John at a London hospital before later placing him in the care of an institution for the physically disabled close to Windsor.

Although Chapman had struggled with alcoholism as an adult, she had reportedly weaned herself off drink by 1880. Her son's disability is believed to have contributed to her gradual reversion to alcohol dependency.

In 1881, the Chapman family relocated from West London to Windsor, where John Chapman took a job as a coachman to a farm bailiff named Josiah Weeks, and the Chapman family living in the attic rooms of St. Leonard Hill Farm Cottage. The following year, Emily Ruth Chapman died of meningitis on her brother's second birthday at the age of 12.

Following the death of their daughter, both Chapman and her husband took to heavy drinking. Over the following years, she is known to have been arrested on several occasions for public intoxication in both Clewer and Windsor, though no records exist of her ever being brought before a magistrates court for these arrests.

Separation
Chapman and her husband separated by mutual consent in 1884. John Chapman retained custody of their surviving daughter, while Annie relocated to London. Her husband was obliged to pay her a weekly allowance of 10s via Post Office Order. The precise reason for the couple's separation is unknown, although a later police report lists the reason for their separation as Annie Chapman's "drunken and immoral ways".

Two years later, in 1886, John Chapman resigned from his job due to his declining health and relocated to New Windsor. He died of liver cirrhosis and edema, on 25 December, leading to the cessation of these weekly payments. Chapman learned of her husband's death via her brother-in-law. Her surviving daughter, Annie Georgina (then aged 13) is believed to have either subsequently been placed in a French institution or to have joined a performing troupe which travelled with a circus in France. Census records from 1891 reveal both of Chapman's surviving children lived with their grandmother in Knightsbridge.

Life in Whitechapel
Following her separation from her husband, Annie Chapman relocated to Whitechapel, primarily living upon the weekly allowance of 10 shillings from her husband. Over the following years, she resided in common lodging-houses in both Whitechapel and Spitalfields. By 1886, she is known to have resided with a man who made wire sieves for a living, consequently becoming known to some acquaintances as "Annie Sievey" or "Siffey". At the end of 1886, her weekly allowance abruptly stopped. Upon enquiring why these weekly payments had suddenly ceased, Chapman discovered her husband had died of alcohol-related causes.

Shortly after John Chapman's death, this sieve-maker left Chapman—possibly due to the cessation of her allowance—and relocated to Notting Hill. One of Chapman's friends said she became depressed after this separation and seemed to lose her will to live.

1888
By May or June 1888, Chapman resided in Crossingham's Lodging House at 35 Dorset Street, paying 8d a night for a double bed. According to the lodging-house deputy, Timothy Donovan, a 47-year-old bricklayer's labourer named Edward "the Pensioner" Stanley would typically stay with Chapman at the lodging-house between Saturday and Monday, occasionally paying for her bed. She earned some income from crochet work, making antimacassars and selling flowers, supplemented by casual prostitution.

Eight days prior to Chapman's death, she had fought with a fellow Crossingham's Lodging House resident named Eliza Cooper. The two were reportedly rivals for the affections of a local hawker named Harry, although Cooper later claimed the reason the two had fought had been because Chapman had borrowed a bar of soap from her, and after being asked to return it, Chapman had simply thrown a halfpenny upon a kitchen table, stating: "Go get a halfpenny's worth of soap." Later, in a fight between the two at the Britannia Public House, Cooper struck Chapman in the face and chest, resulting in her sustaining a black eye and bruised breast.

On 7 September, Amelia Palmer encountered Annie Chapman in Dorset Street. Palmer later informed police Chapman had appeared visibly pale on this occasion, having been discharged from the casual ward of the Whitechapel Infirmary that day. Chapman complained to Palmer of having felt "too ill to do anything".

After Chapman's death, the coroner who conducted her autopsy noted her lungs and brain membranes were in an advanced state of disease which would have killed her within months.

8 September
According to both the lodging-house deputy, Timothy Donovan, and the watchman, John Evans, shortly after midnight on 8 September, Chapman had been lacking the required money for her nightly lodging. She drank a pint of beer in the kitchen with fellow lodger Frederick Stevens at approximately 12:10 a.m. before informing another lodger that she had earlier visited her sister in Vauxhall, and that her family had given her 5d. Stevens then observed Chapman take a box of pills from her pocket. This box then broke, whereupon Chapman wrapped the pills in a section of envelope she had taken from a mantlepiece before leaving the property. At approximately 1:35 a.m., Chapman returned to the lodging-house with a baked potato which she ate before again leaving the premises with a likely intention of earning the money to pay for a bed via prostituting herself, stating: "I won't be long, Brummie. See that Tim keeps the bed for me." Evans last saw Chapman walking in the direction of Spitalfields Market.

A Mrs Elizabeth Long testified at the subsequent inquest into Chapman's murder that she had observed Chapman talking with a man at 5:30 a.m. The two had stood just beyond the back yard of 29 Hanbury Street, Spitalfields. Long described this man as being over 40 years old, slightly taller than Chapman, with dark hair, and of a foreign, "shabby-genteel" appearance. He was wearing a brown low-crowned felt hat and possibly a dark coat. According to Long, the man had asked Chapman the question, "Will you?" to which Chapman replied, "Yes."

Long was certain as to Chapman's identity and the time of this sighting, as she had heard the chiming of a nearby clock strike the half-hour just before she had entered Hanbury Street. If she had indeed seen Chapman, she was likely the last person to see her alive, and in the company of her murderer.

Murder
Shortly before 5:00 a.m. on 8 September, the son of a resident of 29 Hanbury Street, John Richardson, entered the back yard of the property to check the padlocked cellar in the yard was still intact and to trim a loose piece of leather from his boot.<ref>Honeycombe, The Murders of the Black Museum: 1870-1970', p. 57</ref> Richardson verified the cellar was still padlocked, then sat on the rear steps of the property to trim the loose leather from his boot, noting nothing untoward.

At approximately 5:15 a.m., a tenant of 27 Hanbury Street named Albert Cadosch entered the yard of the property to use the lavatory. Cadosch later informed police he had heard a woman say, "No, no!" before hearing the sound of something or someone falling against the fence dividing the back yards of numbers 27 and 29 Hanbury Street. He did not investigate these sounds.

Annie Chapman's mutilated body was discovered shortly before 6:00 a.m. by an elderly resident of 29 Hanbury Street named John Davis. Davis noticed that the front door was now open, while the back door was shut. Her body was lying on the ground near the doorway to the back yard, with her head six inches (15 cm) from the steps to the property. Davis alerted three men named James Green, James Kent, and Henry Holland to his discovery, before all three ran down Commercial Street to find a policeman as Davis reported his discovery at the nearest police station.

At the corner of Hanbury Street, Green, Kent, and Holland found Divisional Inspector Joseph Luniss Chandler and told him, "Another woman has been murdered!" Chandler followed the men to Chapman's body before requesting the assistance of police surgeon Dr George Bagster Phillips and more officers. Several policemen arrived within minutes. They were instructed to clear the passageway to the yard to ensure Dr Phillips had access. Phillips arrived at Hanbury Street at approximately 6:30 a.m.

Dr Phillips was quickly able to establish a definite link between Chapman's murder and the murder of Mary Ann Nichols, which had occurred on 31 August. Nichols had also suffered two deep slash wounds to the throat, inflicted from the left to the right of her neck, before her murderer had mutilated her abdomen, and a blade of similar size and design had been used in both murders. Phillips also observed six areas of blood spattering upon the wall of the house between the steps and wooden palings dividing 27 and 29 Hanbury Street. Some of these spatterings were 18 inches (45 cm) above the ground.

Two pills, which Chapman had been prescribed for a lung condition, a section of a torn envelope, a small piece of frayed coarse muslin, and a comb were recovered close to her body. A leather apron, partially submerged in a dish of water located close to a tap, was also discovered close to her body.

Contemporary press reports also claim that two farthings were also found in the yard of Hanbury Street close to Chapman's body, although no reference is made to these coins in any surviving contemporary police records. The local inspector of the Metropolitan Police Service, Edmund Reid of H Division Whitechapel, was reported as mentioning these coins at an inquest in 1889, and the acting Commissioner of the City Police, Major Henry Smith, also referenced these coins in his memoirs. Smith's memoirs, written more than twenty years after the Whitechapel murders, are generally considered to be both unreliable and embellished for dramatic effect.

Inquest
The official inquest into Chapman's death was opened at the Working Lad's Institute, Whitechapel, on 10 September. This inquest was presided over by the Middlesex coroner, Wynne Edwin Baxter. The first day of the inquest heard testimony from four witnesses, including John Davies, who testified to his discovery of Chapman's body. Davies testified he had lived at Hanbury Street for two weeks and had never seen the door to the yard of the property locked. He added that any individual who knew where the latch to the front door of the property was could open it to facilitate access to the backyard. Also to testify were Timothy Donovan and John Evans, both of whom testified they had positively identified the body of the deceased as Annie Chapman. Donovan also testified he had last seen Chapman alive at approximately 1:50 a.m. on 8 September, and the last words she had spoken to him were: "I have not sufficient money for my bed. Don't let it. I shan't be long before I am in."

Character testimony
Fellow Crossingham's Lodging House resident Amelia Palmer also testified on the first day of the inquest that she had known Chapman for several years, and had been in the habit of writing letters for her. Palmer testified that although Chapman had a fondness for alcohol, she considered her a respectable woman who never used profane language. She also testified Chapman had "not as a regular means of livelihood" been in the habit of selling sexual favours for money, adding she most often earned her income by performing crochet work or purchasing matches and flowers to sell for a small profit and had only begun resorting to prostitution following the death of her husband in December 1886. Every Friday, Chapman would travel to Stratford to "sell anything she had". The lodging-house deputy, Timothy Donovan, testified Chapman had always been on good terms with other lodgers, with the quarrel and resulting fisticuffs between herself and Eliza Cooper on 31 August being the only incident of trouble at the premises involving her. Donovan also testified that although Chapman would typically drink to excess on Saturday nights, she was most often sober for the remainder of the week.

Medical testimony
The third day of the inquest saw testimony from police called to the crime scene and the subsequent post-mortem. This medical testimony indicated that Chapman may have been murdered as late as 5:30 a.m. in the yard of Hanbury Street. Previous testimony from several tenants of 29 Hanbury Street had revealed none had seen or heard anything suspicious at the time of Chapman's murder, with John Richardson testifying on the second day of the inquest that the passageway through the house to the back-yard was not locked, as it was frequented by residents at all hours of the day, and that the front door had been wide open at the time Chapman's body was discovered. Richardson also testified he had often seen strangers, both men and women, loitering in the passageway of the house.

On 13 September, Dr George Bagster Phillips described the body as he observed it at 6:30 a.m. in the back yard of the house at 29 Hanbury Street:

Chapman's throat had been cut from left to right so deeply the bones of her vertebral column bore striations, and she had been disembowelled, with a section of the flesh from her stomach being placed upon her left shoulder and another section of skin and flesh—plus her small intestines—being removed and placed above her right shoulder. The morgue examination revealed that part of her uterus and bladder was missing. Chapman's protruding tongue and swollen face led Dr Phillips to believe that she may have been asphyxiated with the handkerchief around her neck before her throat was cut, and that her murderer had held her chin as he performed this act. As there was no blood trail leading to the yard, he was certain that she was killed where she was found.

Phillips concluded that Chapman suffered from a long-standing lung disease, that she was sober at the time of her death, and that she had not consumed alcoholic beverages for at least some hours before death. He was of the opinion that the murderer must have possessed anatomical knowledge to have sliced out her reproductive organs in a single movement with a blade about 6–8 inches (15–20 cm) long. However, the idea that the murderer possessed surgical skill was dismissed by other experts. As her body was not examined extensively at the scene, it has also been suggested that the organ was removed by mortuary staff, who took advantage of bodies that had already been opened to extract organs that they could then sell as surgical specimens. In his summing up, Coroner Baxter raised the possibility that Chapman was murdered deliberately to obtain the uterus, on the basis that an American had made enquiries at a London medical school for the purchase of such organs. The Lancet rejected Baxter's suggestion, scathingly pointing out "certain improbabilities and absurdities", and saying it was "a grave error of judgement". The British Medical Journal was similarly dismissive, and reported that the physician who requested the samples was a highly reputable doctor, unnamed, who had left the country 18 months before the murder. Baxter dropped the theory and never referred to it again. The Chicago Tribune claimed the American doctor was from Philadelphia, and author Philip Sugden later speculated that the man in question was the notorious Francis Tumblety.

Discussing Chapman's time of death, Dr Phillips estimated that she had died either at or before 4:30 a.m., contradicting the inquest eyewitnesses Richardson, Long and Cadosch, all of whom indicated Chapman's murder had occurred after this time. However, Victorian methods of estimating the time of death of an individual, such as measuring body temperature, were crude by modern methodology. Phillips himself highlighted at the inquest that Chapman's body temperature could have cooled more quickly than normally expected.

Conclusion
The inquest into Chapman's murder lasted five days, with the final day of hearings being adjourned until 26 September. No further witnesses testified on this date, although coroner Baxter informed the jury: "I have no doubt that if the perpetrator of this foul murder is eventually discovered, our efforts will not have been useless."

Following a short deliberation, the jury, having been instructed to consider precisely how, when, and by what means Chapman came about her death, returned a verdict of wilful murder against a person or persons unknown.

Investigation
On 15 September, Chief Inspector Donald Swanson of Scotland Yard was placed in overall command of the investigation into Chapman's murder. Swanson later reported that an "immediate and searching enquiry was made at all common lodging-houses to ascertain if anyone had entered [their premises] on the morning with blood on his hands or clothes, or under any suspicious circumstances".

Leather Apron

A leather apron belonging to John Richardson lay under a tap in the yard of 29 Hanbury Street. This apron had been placed there by his mother, who had washed it on 6 September. Richardson was investigated thoroughly by the police, but was eliminated from the enquiry. Nonetheless, press reports of the discovery of this apron fuelled local rumours which had first been published in The Star on 4 September following the murder of Mary Ann Nichols that a Jew from the district known as "Leather Apron" was responsible for the Whitechapel murders.

Journalists, frustrated by the general unwillingness of the Criminal Investigation Department to reveal many details of their investigation to the public, and eager to capitalise on the increasing public unrest regarding the Whitechapel murders, frequently resorted to writing reports of questionable veracity. Imaginative descriptions of "Leather Apron", using crude Jewish stereotypes, appeared in the press. The Manchester Guardian reported that: "Whatever information may be in the possession of the police they deem it necessary to keep secret ... It is believed their attention is particularly directed to ... a notorious character known as 'Leather Apron'." Rival journalists dismissed these accounts as "a mythical outgrowth of the reporter's fancy".See also 'Daily News, 10 September 1888, quoted in Fido, p. 37

John Pizer, a 38-year-old Polish Jew who made footwear from leather, was known by the name "Leather Apron". Via knifepoint, Pizer frequently intimidated local prostitutes. He appeared before the Thames Magistrates' Court on 4 August 1888, charged with indecent assault. Pizer is also believed to have stabbed a man in the hand in 1887.

Despite there being no direct evidence against Pizer, he was arrested by a Sergeant William Thicke on 10 September. Although Pizer claimed to the contrary, Thicke knew of Pizer's local reputation, and his "Leather Apron" nick-name.

Pizer was released from custody on 11 September after police were able to verify his alibis on the nights of the murders of both Chapman and Nichols. He was called as a witness on the second day of the inquest into Chapman's murder to publicly clear his name, and demolish the public suspicions that he was the killer. Pizer also successfully obtained monetary compensation from at least one newspaper that had published several articles naming him as the prime suspect in the Whitechapel murders.

Pawnbrokers
Two brass rings—one flat; one oval—Chapman is known to have worn were not recovered at the crime scene, either because she had pawned them or because they had been stolen, possibly by her murderer. Theorising her murderer had removed these items of jewellery in order to pawn them, police unsuccessfully searched all the pawnbrokers in Spitalfields and Whitechapel.

Edward Stanley
The section of a torn envelope recovered close to Chapman's body, bearing the crest of the Royal Sussex Regiment and postmarked 'London, 28 August 1888', was briefly believed could be traced to Edward Stanley, thus placing him at the scene of Chapman's murder. Stanley was soon eliminated as a suspect as his alibis for the nights of the murders of both Nichols and Chapman were quickly confirmed. Between 6 August and 1 September, he was known to have been on active duty with the Hampshire Militia in Gosport, and on the night of Chapman's murder, eyewitnesses confirmed Stanley had been at his lodgings.

Further enquiries and arrests
In addition to John Pizer and Edward Stanley, police investigated and/or detained several other individuals in their investigation into Chapman's murder, all of whom were released from custody. On 9 September, a 53-year-old ship's cook named William Henry Piggott was detained after arriving at a Gravesend pub with a recent hand injury and shouting misogynistic remarks. A blood-stained shirt he had left in a local fish shop was quickly traced to Piggott, who claimed that he had been bitten by a woman and that the blood on the shirt was his own. He was investigated, but soon released from custody.

A Swiss butcher, Jacob Isenschmid, matched an eyewitness description of a blood-stained man seen acting suspiciously on the morning of Chapman's murder by a public house landlady, a Mrs Fiddymont. Isenschmid's distinctive appearance included a large ginger moustache, and he was known to have had a history of mental illness. He was arrested on suspicion of committing Chapman's murder on 13 September.

On 18 September, a 40-year-old German hairdresser named Charles Ludwig was arrested after he attempted to stab a young man named Alexander Finlay at a coffee stall while intoxicated. Ludwig was arrested very shortly after this incident in the company of a visibly distressed prostitute, who later informed a policeman: "Dear me! He frightened me very much when he pulled a big knife out." Ludwig was also known to have been wanted by the City of London Police for attempting to slash a woman's throat with a razor.

Isenschmid and Ludwig were both ultimately cleared of suspicion after two further murders were committed on the same date while both were in police custody. Isenschmid was later detained in a mental asylum. Other suspects named in contemporary police records and newspapers pertaining to the investigation into Chapman's murder include a local trader named Friedrich Schumacher, pedlar Edward McKenna, apothecary and mental patient Oswald Puckridge, and insane medical student John Sanders. No evidence exists against any of these individuals.

Media moniker

On 27 September, the Central News Agency received the "Dear Boss" letter, written by an individual claiming to be the murderer. The author of this letter paid reference to the press naming him as "Leather Apron", stating: "That joke about Leather Apron gave me fits". The author concluded this letter with the words "Yours truly, Jack the Ripper". This name quickly supplanted "Leather Apron" as the media's favourite moniker for the murderer.

Funeral
Chapman's body was moved from Hanbury Street to a mortuary in Montagu Street, Marylebone by Sergeant Edward Badham in a handcart large enough to hold one coffin. This was similar to the cart previously used to move the body of Mary Ann Nichols.

Chapman was buried shortly after 9:00 a.m. on 14 September 1888 in a service paid for by her family. She was laid to rest in a communal grave within Manor Park Cemetery, Forest Gate, east London. At the request of Chapman's family, the funeral was not publicised, with no mourning coaches used throughout the service, and only the undertaker, police, and her relatives knowing of these arrangements. Consequently, relatives were the only people to attend the service.

A hearse supplied by Hanbury Street undertaker Henry Smith travelled to the Whitechapel Mortuary in Montague Street to collect Chapman's body at 7:00 a.m. Her body was placed in an elm coffin draped in black and was then driven to Spitalfields undertaker Harry Hawes, who arranged the funeral. Chapman's relatives met the hearse outside the cemetery. Her coffin plate bore the words "Annie Chapman, died Sept. 8, 1888, aged 48 years."

The precise location of Annie Chapman's grave within Manor Park Cemetery is now unknown. A plaque placed in the cemetery by authorities in 2008 reads: "Her remains are buried within this area.".

Media
Film
 A Study in Terror (1965). This film casts Barbara Windsor as Annie Chapman.Parish, The Great Detective Pictures, p. 519
 Love Lies Bleeding (1999). A drama film directed by William Tannen. Chapman is portrayed by Michaela Hans.
 From Hell. (2001). Directed by the Hughes Brothers, the film casts Katrin Cartlidge as Annie Chapman.

Television
 Jack the Ripper (1988). A Thames Television film drama series starring Michael Caine. Annie Chapman is played by actress Deirdre Costello.
 The Real Jack the Ripper (2010). Directed by David Mortin, this series casts Sharon Buhagiar as Annie Chapman and was first broadcast on 31 August 2010.
 Jack the Ripper: The Definitive Story (2011). A two-hour documentary which references original police reports and eyewitness accounts pertaining to the Whitechapel Murderer. Chapman is portrayed by Dianne Learmouth.

Drama
 Jack, the Last Victim (2005). This musical casts Michelle Jeffry as Annie Chapman.

See also
 Cold case
 List of serial killers before 1900
 Unsolved murders in the United Kingdom

Notes

References

Bibliography
 Begg, Paul (2003). Jack the Ripper: The Definitive History. London: Pearson Education. 
 Begg, Paul (2004). Jack the Ripper: The Facts. Barnes & Noble Books. 
 Bell, Neil R. A. (2016). Capturing Jack the Ripper: In the Boots of a Bobby in Victorian England. Stroud: Amberley Publishing. 
 Cook, Andrew (2009). Jack the Ripper. Stroud, Gloucestershire: Amberley Publishing. 
 Eddleston, John J. (2002). Jack the Ripper: An Encyclopedia. London: Metro Books. 
 Evans, Stewart P.; Rumbelow, Donald (2006). Jack the Ripper: Scotland Yard Investigates. Stroud, Gloucestershire: Sutton Publishing. 
 Evans, Stewart P.; Skinner, Keith (2000). The Ultimate Jack the Ripper Sourcebook: An Illustrated Encyclopedia. London: Constable and Robinson. 
 Evans, Stewart P.; Skinner, Keith (2001). Jack the Ripper: Letters from Hell. Stroud, Gloucestershire: Sutton Publishing. 
 Fido, Martin (1987). The Crimes, Death and Detection of Jack the Ripper. Vermont: Trafalgar Square. 
 Gordon, R. Michael (2000). Alias Jack the Ripper: Beyond the Usual Whitechapel Suspects. North Carolina: McFarland Publishing. 
 Harris, Melvin (1994). The True Face of Jack the Ripper. London: Michael O'Mara Books Ltd. 
 Holmes, Ronald M.; Holmes, Stephen T. (2002). Profiling Violent Crimes: An Investigative Tool. Thousand Oaks, California: Sage Publications, Inc. 
 Honeycombe, Gordon (1982). The Murders of the Black Museum: 1870-1970. London: Bloomsbury Books. 
 Lynch, Terry; Davies, David (2008). Jack the Ripper: The Whitechapel Murderer. Hertfordshire: Wordsworth Editions. 
 Marriott, Trevor (2005). Jack the Ripper: The 21st Century Investigation. London: John Blake. 
 Rumbelow, Donald (2004). The Complete Jack the Ripper: Fully Revised and Updated. Penguin Books. 
 Sugden, Philip (2002). The Complete History of Jack the Ripper. Carroll & Graf Publishers. 
 Waddell, Bill (1993). The Black Museum: New Scotland Yard. London: Little, Brown and Company. 
 Whittington-Egan, Richard; Whittington-Egan, Molly (1992). The Murder Almanac. Glasgow: Neil Wilson Publishing. 
 Whittington-Egan, Richard (2013). Jack the Ripper: The Definitive Casebook. Stroud: Amberley Publishing. 
 Wilson, Colin; Odell, Robin (1987) Jack the Ripper: Summing Up and Verdict''. Bantam Press.

External links

 Contemporary news article pertaining to the murder of Annie Chapman
 BBC News article pertaining to the murders committed by Jack the Ripper
 Casebook: Jack the Ripper
 The Whitechapel Murder Victims: Annie Chapman at whitechapeljack.com

1841 births
1880s murders in London
1888 deaths
1888 murders in the United Kingdom
19th-century English women
English female prostitutes
English murder victims
Female murder victims
Jack the Ripper victims
People from Paddington
People of the Victorian era